Municipal elections were held in San Diego in 2010 for city council and propositions. The primary election was held on June 8, 2010, and the general election was held on November 2, 2010. Four of the eight seats of the San Diego City Council were contested. This was the last election to use eight council districts. Two incumbents ran for reelection in their council district.

Municipal elections in California are officially non-partisan, although most members do identify a party preference. A two-round system was used for the election, starting with a primary in June followed by a runoff in November between the top-two candidates if no candidate received a majority of the votes in the first round.

City Council

The 2010 election was the last to use the eight district boundaries created by the 2000 Redistricting Commission. Seats in districts 2, 4, 6, and 8 were up for election.

District 2 
District 2 consisted of the communities of Bankers Hill/Park West, Downtown San Diego, La Jolla/Mount Soledad, Little Italy, Midway/North Bay, Mission Beach, Mission Hills, Ocean Beach, Old Town, Pacific Beach, and Point Loma. Incumbent council member Kevin Faulconer was reelected with a majority of the votes in the June primary.

District 4 
District 4 consisted of the communities of Alta Vista, Broadway Heights, Chollas View, Emerald Hills, Encanto, Jamacha, Lincoln Park, Lomita Village, Mount Hope, Mountain View, North Bay Terrace, Oak Park, O'Farrell, Paradise Hills, Ridgeview, Skyline Hills, South Bay Terrace, Valencia Park, and Webster. Incumbent council member Tony Young was reelected with a majority of the vote in June primary.

District 6 
District 6 consisted of the communities of Bay Ho, Bay Park, Clairemont Mesa, Fashion Valley, Kearny Mesa, Linda Vista, Mission Valley, North Clairemont, and Serra Mesa. Incumbent council member Donna Frye was ineligible to run for reelection due to term limits. Lorie Zapf was elected after advancing to the November general election and receiving a majority of the votes.

District 8 
District 8 consisted of the southern communities of San Diego and those along the Mexico–United States border, including the communities of Barrio Logan, Egger Highlands, Grant Hill, Golden Hill, Logan Heights, Memorial, Nestor, Ocean View Hills, Otay Mesa West, Otay Mesa East, San Ysidro, Sherman Heights, Southcrest, Stockton, and Tijuana River Valley. Incumbent council member Ben Hueso was ineligible to run for reelection due to term limits. David Alvarez was elected after advancing to the November general election and receiving a majority of the votes.

Council President
The new city council was sworn in December 2010. Tony Young was unanimously elected as council president and Kevin Faulconer was elected as council president pro tem by their fellow council members.

June propositions

Proposition C 
Ballot title: Amends the City Charter Relating to Limitations and Credits for Veterans' Preference Points

Ballot language: "Shall the Charter be amended to extend eligibility for veterans' preference points in any original Civil Service examination to veterans who have served in the United States Armed Forces during any war, major military action or peacekeeping mission, and to provide an additional five percent credit for any veteran or the spouse of any veteran who has qualifying service-related disability?"

Proposition D 
Ballot title: Revises the City Charter Relating to the Strong Mayor Form of Governance

Ballot language: "Shall the Charter be revised to make permanent the Strong Mayor form of governance; add a ninth Council seat; and, when the ninth seat is filled, increase the Council votes required to override a mayoral veto to a two-thirds vote?"

November propositions

Proposition B 
Ballot title: Amends City Charter to Add Good Cause Requirement for Certain Terminations or Suspensions of Deputy City Attorneys

Ballot language: "Shall the Charter be amended to establish a good cause requirement for the termination or suspension of Deputy City Attorneys who have served continuously for two years or more, except that any Deputy City Attorney may be subject to layoff due to lack of work or insufficient appropriations?"

Proposition C 
Ballot title: Amending Ordinance Number O-18568 (Proposition M of 1998) Relating to Development of Pacific Highlands Ranch

Ballot language: "Shall Proposition M be amended, allowing completion of parks, library, trails, recreation and transportation facilities for Pacific Highlands Ranch by removing a development timing restriction based on completion of the SR-56/I-5 Interchange, only after City Council approves a program of phased development ensuring facilities are constructed before or concurrent with new development, paid for by developers at no cost to taxpayers?"

Proposition D 
Ballot title: If Financial Reform Conditions Are Met, Authorizes Temporary One-Half Cent Sales Tax

Ballot language: "To help offset severe state cuts and help restore essential services, including police, fire and street resurfacing, shall the City of San Diego enact a temporary one-half cent sales tax for up to five years, only if the independent City Auditor certifies conditions have been met, including pension reforms and managed competition?"

References

External links 

 San Diego Office of the City Clerk
 Voter Pamphlets and Election Results by Election Date (from 1970 forward)
 Propositions: Ballot Questions and Results by Decade (from 1900 forward)

2010 California elections
San Diego City Council elections
2010s in San Diego